The Toilers is a 1919 British romantic drama film starring Ronald Colman as a young man who leaves behind his family and girl in a Cornish fishing village to seek his fortune in London. Two of five reels survive.

Cast
 Manora Thew as Rose
 George Dewhurst as Jack
 Gwynne Herbert as Mother
 Ronald Colman as Bob
 Eric Barker as Jack (as a child)
 John Corrie as Lighthouse Keeper
 Mollie Terraine as Merchant's Daughter

References

External links
 
 The Toilers (1919) at the British Film Institute
 The Toilers at silentera.com

British romantic drama films
British silent feature films
British black-and-white films
Films based on French novels
Films based on works by Victor Hugo
Films set in Cornwall
Films set in London
1919 romantic drama films
Lost British films
1919 lost films
Lost romantic drama films
1919 films
1910s British films
Silent romantic drama films